O Filme dos Espíritos is a 2011 Brazilian drama film directed by Michel Dubret and André Marouço, based on the book The Spirits Book by Allan Kardec. The film was released in Brazil on October 7, 2011 in celebration of the birthday month of Kardec.

Plot
The film follows the story of Bruno Alves (Reinaldo Rodrigues) that, by the age of 40, loses his wife. The loss of his job adds to its deep sadness and suicide seems the only way out. That's when he meets The Spirits Book, work of the spiritist doctrine.

Cast
Flávio Barollo as Dante
Sandra Corveloni as Mother
Blota Filho as	Man in the séance
Etty Fraser as Dona Maria
Luciana Gimenez as Roseli
Ênio Gonçalves as Waiter / former inmate
Briza Menezes as Luisa
Alethea Miranda as Daughter
Reinaldo Rodrigues as Bruno Alves
Ana Rosa as Gabi
Warley Santana as Funeral's makeup artist
Nelson Xavier as Levy

References

External links
  
 

2011 films
Brazilian drama films
Films about Spiritism
2011 drama films
2010s Portuguese-language films